is a Japanese professional baseball pitcher for the Chunichi Dragons in Japan's Nippon Professional Baseball. He formerly played for the Fukuoka SoftBank Hawks.

Professional career
On October 3, 2007, Iwasaki was drafted by the Fukuoka Softbank Hawks in the 2007 Nippon Professional Baseball draft.

2008–2010 season
On July 23, 2008, Iwasaki pitched his debut game as a starting pitcher against the Orix Buffaloes.

In 2008 - 2010 season, he pitched 8 games in the Pacific League.

2011–2015 season
On May 13, 2011, Iwasaki won the game for the first time in 4 years. In 2011 season, he finished the regular season with a 13 Games pitched, a 6–2 Win–loss record, a 2.72 ERA, a 33 strikeouts in 79 1/3 innings. And he was selected as the Japan Series roster in the 2011 Japan Series.

In 2012 season, Iwasaki finished the regular season with a 29 Games pitched, a 5–10 Win–loss record, a 3.14 ERA, a 3 Holds, a 77 strikeouts in 120 1/3 innings.

In 2013 season, Iwasaki pitched as a relief pitcher, and finished the regular season with a 47 Games pitched, a 1–4 Win–loss record, a 4.33 ERA, a 14 Holds, a two Saves, a 54 strikeouts in 68 2/3 innings.

In 2014 season, Iwasaki pitched as a starting pitcher, and finished the regular season with a 18 Games pitched, a 4–1 Win–loss record, a 4.06 ERA, a 3 Holds, a 37 strikeouts in 62 innings. And he pitched as a relief pitcher in the 2014 Japan Series.

In 2015 season, Iwasaki finished the regular season with a 8 Games pitched, a 1–0 Win–loss record, a 6.75 ERA, a 2 Holds, a 5 strikeouts in 10 1/3 innings. And he was selected as the Japan Series roster in the 2015 Japan Series.

2016–2020 season
In 2016 season, Iwasaki finished the regular season with a 35 Games pitched, a 4–2 Win–loss record, a 1.95 ERA, a 2 Holds, one Saves, a 61 strikeouts in 87 2/3 innings.

In 2017 season, Iwasaki finished the regular season  as a Setup man with a 6–3 Win–loss record, a 1.99 ERA, 66 strikeouts in 72 1/3 innings, a 40 Holds, and a 2 saves, and he won the 2017 Pacific League Hold Champion with 72 Games pitched (Hawks's new record), the most in the Pacific League. And he pitched as a Setup man in the 2017 Japan Series.

On April 10, 2018, Iwasaki had right elbow surgery and spent the rest of the season on rehabilitation.

On August 21, 2019, Iwasaki made a comeback and pitched for the first time in a year and three months. And he was selected as the Japan Series roster in the 2019 Japan Series.

In 2020 season, Iwasaki finished the regular season with a 17 Games pitched, a 0–2 Win–loss record, a 7.20 ERA, a 10 Holds, a 20 strikeouts in 15 innings. In the 2020 Japan Series against the Yomiuri Giants, He pitched in two games, Game 2 and Game 4, and contributed to the team's fourth consecutive Japan Series champion with no hits and no runs.

References

External links

NPB stats
Sho Iwasaki PLAYERS2021 - Fukuoka SoftBank Hawks Official site

1989 births
Baseball people from Chiba Prefecture
People from Funabashi
Chunichi Dragons players
Fukuoka SoftBank Hawks players
Japanese expatriate baseball players in the Dominican Republic
Living people
Nippon Professional Baseball pitchers
Águilas Cibaeñas players
Criollos de Caguas players
Japanese expatriate baseball players in Puerto Rico